Eupoecilia dynodesma is a species of moth of the family Tortricidae. It is found in the border area between India and Pakistan.

References

Moths described in 1971
Eupoecilia